Nicolae "Bubi" Florescu (14 November 1949 – 21 September 2011) was a Romanian professional footballer and manager. In his career, he played mostly for Steagul Roșu Brașov and FC Bihor Oradea, but also for teams such as Înfrățirea Oradea, Minerul Bihor and Unirea Valea lui Mihai.

As a manager, Florescu activated at third tier clubs such as Minerul Bihor or Unirea Valea lui Mihai and until 1992 he was a coach at the Bihorul Sports High School (LPS Bihorul).

Club career

Steagul Roșu Brașov
Florescu started his senior career at Steagul Roșu Brașov in 1967, where he also made his debut in the Divizia A. On 26 November 1967, he scored the only goal of a victory against ASA Târgu Mureș, now that goal ranking him as the 10th youngest scorer in the history of the team from Brașov.

Florescu played in 107 matches (82 in the Divizia A and 25 in the Divizia B) and scored 35 goals (20 in the Divizia A and 15 in the Divizia B) for Steagul Roșu Brașov. At "the Flaggers" he was part of a squad that was formed by players such as Mihai Ivăncescu, Iuliu Jenei, Marin Olteanu, Stere Adamache, Mircea Albu, Petru Cadar, Francisc Bálint, Alexandru Gergely, Dorin Necula, Emil Dumitriu, Nicolae Pescaru, Liviu Drăgoi, Csaba Györffy, Leonard Rusu or Octavian Cojocaru, among others.

Bihor Oradea
In 1972, Florescu left Steagul Roșu Brașov for the second-tier side FC Bihor Oradea, where in the next years was followed by two former teammates, Mircea Albu and Alexandru Gergely. The three men from Brașov, together with local players such as Attila Kun, Ioan Agud, Gheorghe Dărăban, Paul Popovici, Constantin Bigan, Árpád Szűcs, Ioan Naom, Cornel Georgescu or  Cornel Lupău made a team, that over years would be known as "the golden generation of FC Bihor".

He played in 102 top-flight matches for "the red and blues" and approx. 130 second tier matches, also scoring 26 goals in the Divizia A. Nicolae Florescu is considered now a legend of FC Bihor.

Late years
After 1983, he played and managed for Divizia C clubs Minerul Bihor and Unirea Valea lui Mihai, then until 1992 worked as a coach for the Bihorul Sports High School (LPS Bihorul).

International career
Nicolae Florescu was selected by the Romania national football team in 1978, for a friendly tournament that was held in Scotland.

Death
Nicolae Florescu passed away on 21 September 2011, at only 61 years old, after a long suffering.

Honours
Steagul Roșu Brașov
 Divizia B: 1968–69

Bihor Oradea
 Divizia B: 1974–75, 1981–82

References

1949 births
2011 deaths
People from Codlea
Romanian footballers
Association football forwards
Liga I players
Liga II players
FC Brașov (1936) players
FC Bihor Oradea players
Romanian football managers